franchise is a Japanese monster, or kaiju, media franchise consisting of films, television series, novels, comic books, video games, and other merchandise. The franchise is centered on the fictional kaiju Godzilla, a prehistoric reptilian monster awakened and powered by nuclear radiation. The franchise is recognized by the Guinness World Records as the "longest continuously running film franchise", having been in ongoing production since 1954, with several hiatuses of varying lengths. The film franchise consists of 38 films; 33 Japanese films produced and distributed by Toho Co., Ltd. and five American films: one produced by TriStar Pictures and four produced by Legendary Pictures.

The original film, Godzilla, was directed by and co-written by Ishirō Honda and released by Toho in 1954. It became an influential classic of the genre. It featured political and social undertones relevant to Japan at the time. The original introduced an acclaimed music score by Akira Ifukube, reused in many later films. The 1954 film and its special effects director Eiji Tsuburaya are largely credited for establishing the template for tokusatsu, a technique of practical special effects filmmaking that would become essential in Japan's film industry since the release of Godzilla (1954). For its North American release, the film was localized in 1956 as Godzilla, King of the Monsters!. It featured new footage with Raymond Burr edited together with the original Japanese footage.

The popularity of the films has led to the franchise expanding to other media, such as television, music, literature and video games. Godzilla has become one of the most recognizable symbols in Japanese pop culture worldwide and remains a well-known facet of Japanese films and was one of the first examples of the popular kaiju and tokusatsu subgenres in Japanese entertainment.

The tone and themes vary per film. Several of the films have political themes, others have dark tones, complex internal mythology, or are simple action movies featuring aliens or other monsters, while others have simpler themes accessible to children. Godzilla's role varies from purely a destructive force to an ally of humans, or a protector of Japanese values, or a hero to children. The name Godzilla is a romanization of the original Japanese name Gojira (ゴジラ)—which is a combination of two Japanese words: gorira (ゴリラ), "gorilla", and kujira (クジラ), "whale". The word alludes to the size, power and aquatic origin of Godzilla. As developed by Toho, the monster is an offshoot of the combination of radioactivity and ancient dinosaur-like creatures, indestructible and possessing special powers (see Godzilla characteristics).

History

The Godzilla film series is broken into several (different) eras reflecting a characteristic style and corresponding to the same eras used to classify all kaiju eiga (monster movies) in Japan. The first, second, and fourth eras refer to the Japanese emperor during production: the Shōwa era, the Heisei era, and the Reiwa era. The third is called the Millennium era, as the emperor (Heisei) is the same, but these films are considered to have a different style and storyline than the Heisei era.

Over the series' history, the films have reflected the social and political climate in Japan. In the original film, Godzilla was an allegory for the effects of the hydrogen bomb, and the consequences that such weapons might have on Earth. The radioactive contamination of the Japanese fishing boat Lucky Dragon No. 5 through the United States' Castle Bravo thermonuclear device test on Bikini Atoll on March 1, 1954, led to much press coverage in Japan preceding the release of the first movie in 1954. The Heisei and Millennium series have largely continued this concept. Toho was inspired to make the original Godzilla film after the commercial success of the 1952 re-release of King Kong and the success of The Beast from 20,000 Fathoms (1953), the first live-action film to feature a giant monster awakened following an atomic bomb detonation. The success of the Godzilla franchise itself would go on to inspire other giant monster films worldwide.

Shōwa era (1954–1975)
The initial series of films are named after the Shōwa era (as all of these films were produced during Emperor Shōwa's reign). This Shōwa timeline spanned from 1954, with Godzilla, to 1975, with Terror of Mechagodzilla. Starting with Ghidorah, the Three-Headed Monster, Godzilla began evolving into a friendlier, more playful antihero (this transition was complete by Son of Godzilla, where Godzilla is depicted as a more virtuous character) and, as years went by, it evolved into an anthropomorphic superhero. Ghidorah the Three-Headed Monster was also significant for introducing Godzilla's archenemy and the main antagonist of the film series, King Ghidorah.

Son of Godzilla and All Monsters Attack were aimed at youthful audiences, featuring the appearance of Godzilla's son, Minilla. Godzilla vs. Mechagodzilla was notable for introducing Godzilla's robot duplicate and the secondary antagonist of the film series, Mechagodzilla. The Shōwa period loosely tied in to a number of Toho-produced films in which Godzilla himself did not appear and consequently saw the addition of many monsters into the Godzilla continuity, three of which (Rodan, Varan, and Mothra) originated in their own solo movies and another five (Anguirus, Manda, Baragon, Gorosaurus and Kumonga) appeared in their first films as either secondary antagonists or secondary kaiju.

Haruo Nakajima mainly portrayed Godzilla since 1954 until his retirement in 1972. However, other stunt actors have portrayed the character in his absence, such as Katsumi Tezuka, Yū Sekida, Ryosaku Takasugi, Seiji Onaka, Shinji Takagi, Isao Zushi, and Toru Kawai. Eiji Tsuburaya directed the special effects for the first six films of the series. His protege Sadamasa Arikawa took over the effects work for the next three films (with Tsuburaya supervising), while Teruyoshi Nakano directed the special effects for the last six films of the series. The Criterion Collection released the Shōwa era films as part of a Blu-ray box set in the United States and Canada on October 29, 2019.

Heisei era (1984–1995)
Toho rebooted the series in 1984 with The Return of Godzilla, starting the second era of Godzilla films, known as the Heisei series. The Return of Godzilla serves as a direct sequel to the original 1954 film and ignores the subsequent events of the Shōwa era. The Return of Godzilla was released in 1984, five years before the new Emperor, but is considered part of this era, as it is a direct predecessor to Godzilla vs. Biollante (1989), which came out in the first year of the new Emperor's reign.

The Heisei films are set in a single timeline, with each film providing continuity to the other films, and brings Godzilla back as a destructive force of nature that is feared by humans. The biological nature and science behind Godzilla became a much more discussed issue in the films, showing the increased focus on the moral aspects of genetics. Godzilla vs. King Ghidorah gave Godzilla's first concrete birth story, featuring a dinosaur named Godzillasaurus that was mutated by nuclear radiation into Godzilla. Godzilla was portrayed by Kenpachiro Satsuma for the Heisei films while the special effects were directed by Koichi Kawakita, with the exception of The Return of Godzilla, for which the effects were directed by Teruyoshi Nakano.

Millennium era (1999–2004)
Toho rebooted the franchise for a second time with the 1999 film Godzilla 2000: Millennium starting the third era of Godzilla films, known as the Millennium series. The Millennium series is treated similarly to an anthology series where each film is a standalone story, with the 1954 film serving as the only previous point of reference. Godzilla Against Mechagodzilla and Godzilla: Tokyo S.O.S. are the only films in the series to share continuity with each other and are also connected to 1961's Mothra.

After the release of 2004's Godzilla: Final Wars, marking the 50th anniversary of the Godzilla film franchise, Toho decided to put the series on hiatus for another 10 years. Toho also demolished the water stage on its lot used in numerous Godzilla, kaiju and tokusatsu films. Yoshimitsu Banno, who had directed 1971's Godzilla vs. Hedorah, secured the rights from Toho to make an IMAX 3D short film production, based on a story similar to his Hedorah film. This project eventually led to the development of Legendary's Godzilla. Tsutomu Kitagawa portrayed Godzilla for the majority of the Millennium films, with the exception of Godzilla, Mothra and King Ghidorah: Giant Monsters All-Out Attack, in which Godzilla was portrayed by Mizuho Yoshida. Unlike the Shōwa and later Heisei films, the special effects for the Millennium films were directed by multiple effects directors such as Kenji Suzuki (Godzilla 2000, Godzilla vs. Megaguirus), Makoto Kamiya (Godzilla, Mothra and King Ghidorah: Giant Monsters All-Out Attack), Yuichi Kikuchi (Godzilla Against Mechagodzilla), and Eiichi Asada (Godzilla: Tokyo S.O.S., Godzilla: Final Wars).

Reiwa era (2016–present)

In December 2014, Toho announced plans for a new Godzilla film of their own for a 2016 release. The film is Toho's reboot of the Godzilla franchise, after Legendary Pictures' reboot in 2014; the film is co-directed by Hideaki Anno and Shinji Higuchi (both of whom collaborated on the anime Neon Genesis Evangelion), with the screenplay by Anno and the visual effects directed by Higuchi. Principal photography began on September and ended in October with the special effects work following in November that year. Shin Godzilla was released in Japan on July 29, 2016, in IMAX, 4DX, and MX4D to positive reviews and was a box office success.

In August 2016, Toho announced plans for a trilogy of anime Godzilla films with Polygon Pictures animating the films and Netflix distributing the trilogy worldwide, except in Japan where each film will be given a theatrical release by Toho. The first film, titled Godzilla: Planet of the Monsters, was released on November 17, 2017. The second film, titled Godzilla: City on the Edge of Battle, was released on May 18, 2018. The third and final film in the trilogy, titled Godzilla: The Planet Eater, was released on November 9, 2018.

In January 2018, Toho announced its plans to invest  for the next three years beginning in 2019 to co-produce content with Hollywood and Chinese studios who have licensed Toho's properties, such as Godzilla, Your Name and Pokémon. Toho would invest 25% in production costs and would earn a higher share in revenue and manage creators rights, so their creative input would be reflected in each work. In May 2018, Toho's Chief Godzilla Officer Keiji Ota revealed that a sequel to Shin Godzilla would not happen, but revealed plans for a "World of Godzilla", a shared cinematic universe between Godzilla and other Toho monsters after 2021. Ota cited the Marvel Cinematic Universe as an influence, with plans to release a new film every one to two years. Ota stated:

In 2019, Toho invested  into their Los Angeles-based subsidiary Toho International Inc. as part of their "Toho Vision 2021 Medium-term Management Strategy", a strategy to increase content, platform, real-estate, surpass  in profits, and increase character businesses on Toho intellectual properties such as Godzilla. Hiroyasu Matsuoka was named the representative director of the project. In 2019, Toho launched the first official English website and the first official English Twitter and Instagram for the franchise.

In June 2019, Toho revealed plans to present the Toho Godzilla at the San Diego Comic-Con for the first time to commemorate the franchise's 65th anniversary, as well as being part of their plan to expand the franchise in the United States. At the San Diego Comic-Con, Akito Takahashi, the project manager of Toho's Godzilla Strategic Conference, revealed Toho's intentions to have the Toho and Legendary Godzilla films expand together. He also revealed that the option to reintroduce political themes and old or new monsters would be available to filmmakers, should they choose to pursue it. Akito also expressed interest in re-introducing Mechagodzilla and Jet Jaguar in the future.

In October 2020, Toho announced plans for an anime series titled Godzilla Singular Point released on Netflix in 2021, revealing artwork for Godzilla and its principal characters. The project was directed by Atsushi Takahashi, with music by Kan Sawada, written by Toh Enjoe, character designs by Kazue Kato, and animations by Eiji Yamamori. The series was produced by Bones Inc. in partnership with Orange Co., Ltd., featured hand-drawn and CG animation, and had no relation to Polygon's anime film trilogy.

On November 3, 2022, during the franchise's 68th anniversary known as "Godzilla Day", Toho announced plans to release a new live-action Godzilla film on November 3, 2023 to commemorate the franchise's 69th anniversary. Toho also announced Takashi Yamazaki as the director, writer, and visual effects supervisor and that the film had entered post-production after recently completed filming.

American films

Unproduced 3D film (1983)

In 1983, director Steve Miner pitched his idea for an American 3D production of Godzilla to Toho, with storyboards by William Stout and a script written by Fred Dekker, titled Godzilla: King of the Monsters in 3D, which featured Godzilla destroying San Francisco in an attempt to find its offspring. Various studios and producers expressed interest but passed it over due to high budget concerns. The film would have featured a full scale animatronic Godzilla head built by Rick Baker, stop motion animation executed by David W. Allen, an articulated stop motion Godzilla figure created by Stephen Czerkas, and additional storyboards by Doug Wildey. The production design would have been overseen by William Stout.

TriStar Pictures (1998–2000)

In October 1992, TriStar Pictures acquired the rights from Toho with plans to produce a trilogy. Director Jan de Bont and writers Terry Rossio and Ted Eliott developed a script that had Godzilla battling a shape-shifting alien called "the Gryphon". De Bont later left the project after budget disagreements with the studio. Roland Emmerich was hired to direct and co-write a new script with producer Dean Devlin.

A co-production between Centropolis Entertainment, Fried Films, Independent Pictures, and TriStar Pictures, Godzilla was theatrically released on May 20, 1998 to negative reviews and grossed $379 million worldwide against a production budget between $130–150 million. Despite grossing nearly three times its budget, it was considered a box office disappointment. Two planned sequels were cancelled and an animated TV series was produced instead. TriStar let the license expire in 2003. In 2004, Toho began trademarking new iterations of TriStar's Godzilla as "Zilla", with only the incarnations from the 1998 film and animated TV series retaining the Godzilla copyright/trademark.

Legendary Pictures (2014–present)

In 2004, director Yoshimitsu Banno acquired permission from Toho to produce a short IMAX Godzilla film. In 2009, the project was turned over to Legendary Pictures to be redeveloped as a feature film. Announced in March 2010, the film was co-produced with Warner Bros. Pictures and was directed by Gareth Edwards.

Godzilla was theatrically released on May 16, 2014, to positive reviews and was a box office success, grossing $529 million worldwide against a production budget of $160 million. The film's success prompted Toho to produce a reboot of their own and Legendary to proceed with sequels and a shared cinematic franchise dubbed the MonsterVerse, with Godzilla: King of the Monsters released on May 31, 2019, and Godzilla vs. Kong released on March 24, 2021. Legendary's license to Godzilla expired in 2020. However, in January 2022, Legendary announced that Apple TV+ had ordered a live-action MonsterVerse series featuring Godzilla and other Titans. A fifth MonsterVerse film is scheduled to be released on March 15, 2024.

Filmography

Toho films

American films

Guest appearances
In 2007, a CGI Godzilla appeared in the Toho slice of life film Always: Sunset on Third Street 2. In an imaginary sequence, Godzilla destroys part of 1959 Tokyo, with one of the main protagonists getting angry that Godzilla damaged his car showroom. The making of the sequence was kept a secret. Godzilla has been referenced in, and has briefly appeared in, several other films. Godzilla guest starred in the show Crayon Shin-chan as an antagonist. Godzilla also appears in cave paintings (alongside Rodan, Mothra and King Ghidorah) in a post-credits scene in Kong: Skull Island. In 2019, Godzilla made an appearance in the anime film Shinkansen Henkei Robo Shinkalion the Movie: Mirai Kara Kita Shinsoku no ALFA-X.

Localized releases
In 1956, Jewell Enterprises Inc., released Godzilla, King of the Monsters!, an American localization of Godzilla (1954). This version removed most of the political themes and social commentaries, resulting in 30 minutes of footage from the Japanese version replaced with new footage featuring Raymond Burr interacting with Japanese actors and look-alikes to make it seem like Burr was a part of the original Japanese production. In addition, the soundtrack and sound effects were slightly altered and some dialogue was dubbed into English. This release is referred to as an "Americanization" or the "Americanized" version by some sources. Similar localizations (or Americanizations) occurred for the U.S. releases of King Kong vs. Godzilla and The Return of Godzilla, released in the U.S. as Godzilla 1985; the latter which had Burr reprising the role of Steve Martin from Godzilla, King of the Monsters!.

In 1957, Harry Rybnick attempted to produce The Volcano Monsters, a film that would have localized Godzilla Raids Again by using its monster footage mixed with new footage featuring additional effects and American actors to create a new film; however, funding from AB-PT Pictures collapsed after the company closed down and Godzilla Raids Again was instead re-cut, dubbed in English, and released in 1959 by Warner Bros. as Gigantis the Fire Monster.

In 1976, Italian director Luigi Cozzi intended to re-release Godzilla in Italy. Facing resistance from exhibitors to showing a black-and-white film, Cozzi instead licensed a negative of Godzilla, King of the Monsters from Toho and created a new movie in color, adding much stock footage of graphic death and destruction and short scenes from newsreel footage from World War II, which he released as Godzilla in 1977. The film was colorized using a process called Spectrorama 70, where color gels are put on the original black-and-white film, becoming one of the first black-and-white movies to be colorized. Dialogue was dubbed into Italian and new music was added. After the initial Italian run, the negative became Toho's property and prints have only been exhibited in Italy from that time onward. Italian firm Yamato Video at one time intended to release the colorized version on a two-disc DVD along with the original Godzilla.

Reception

Box office performance
Below is a chart listing the number of tickets sold for each Godzilla film in Japan including the imported American films, along with their gross revenue in Japan and outside of Japan. The films are listed from the most attended to the least attended. Almost all of the 1960s films were reissued, so the lifetime number of tickets sold is listed with the initial release ticket numbers mentioned in notes.

By 1974, the first 13 films had grossed  in overseas box office revenue outside of Japan. In 1977, James Robert Parish and Michael R. Pitts reported that the first 13 films had grossed over  outside of Japan and estimated that they also grossed more than  within Japan.

The first fifteen Godzilla films sold about  tickets in Japan up until 1984, and the first 21 Godzilla films sold  tickets in Japan up until 1995. Toho's first 28 Godzilla films (excluding the American productions) up until Final Wars (2004) had sold over  tickets in Japan. It was the highest-grossing film series in Japan, up until it was surpassed by the anime film series Doraemon when it exceeded  ticket sales in 2013. With the release of Shin Godzilla (2016), Toho's Godzilla film series (excluding the American productions) had sold more than  tickets at the Japanese box office.

Toho productions

American productions

TBA, To be ascertained.

Critical and public response

Other media

Television

Japan
In 1973, Godzilla was featured in Toho's tokusatsu series Zone Fighter, which also featured King Ghidorah and Gigan in a few episodes. Several filmmakers who had worked on previous Godzilla films participated in the series; Tomoyuki Tanaka produced the series, directors Ishirō Honda and Jun Fukuda directed a few episodes – Fukuda also wrote episode four, effects director Teruyoshi Nakano contributed to the special effects, while Kōichi Kawakita (who would direct the effects for Toho's Heisei era films) served as assistant effects director. In 1992, Toho produced a children's educational animated series titled Godzilland which featured live-action segments mixed with chibi-styled animation. In 1997, Toho produced a children's series titled Godzilla Island, centered on Godzilla toys. Toho made the series available worldwide on their official YouTube channel in November 2022. In October 2020, Toho announced Godzilla Singular Point; an anime series directed by Atsushi Takahashi, written by Toh EnJoe, and animated by Japanese studios Bones and Orange. Godzilla Singular Point aired on Japanese television in April 2021 and released worldwide on Netflix in June 2021.

United States
Godzilla and its likeness has appeared in various television-related media, including Robot Chicken, Roseanne, Animaniacs, South Park, Malcolm In The Middle, Chappelle's Show, Rugrats, a Nike commercial with Charles Barkley battling Godzilla, and multiple appearances on The Simpsons, including a Halloween spoof titled Homerzilla.

In 1978, Hanna-Barbera produced the animated series Godzilla and ran for two seasons on NBC. In 2022, Toho made the complete Hanna-Barbera series available worldwide on their official YouTube channel. In 1991, the English dubbed versions of Ebirah, Horror of the Deep (as Godzilla vs. the Sea Monster) and Godzilla vs. Megalon were riffed on Mystery Science Theater 3000. In 1998, Columbia TriStar Television produced Godzilla: The Series; developed by Jeff Kline and Richard Raynis, the series served as a sequel to the 1998 film Godzilla and ran for two seasons on Fox Kids. In January 2022, Legendary Television announced that Apple TV+ had ordered a live-action series set in the MonsterVerse titled Godzilla and the Titans.

Video games

A game called Gojira-kun (which was originally going to be titled Gojiraland) was released for the MSX in 1985. In 1990, Gojira-kun: Kaijū Daikōshin was released for the Game Boy. In 1993, Super Godzilla was released for the SNES. In 2007, Godzilla: Unleashed  was released for the Wii and DS. The 2014 video game Godzilla was released by Bandai Namco. In September 2021, Stern released Godzilla. In May 2022, Call of Duty: Warzone featured a cross-over event for Godzilla vs. Kong. Godzila would be confirmed to play in the Kaiju fighting game GigaBash as a guest character.

Literature

A Godzilla series of books was published by Random House during the late 1990s and the first half of 2000. The company created different series for different age groups, the Scott Ciencin series being aimed at preteens and the Marc Cerasini series being aimed at teens and young adults. Several manga have been derived from specific Godzilla films and both Marvel and Dark Horse have published Godzilla comic book series (1977–1979 and 1987–1999, respectively). In 2011, IDW Publishing started a new series, Godzilla: Kingdom of Monsters (published in book form under the same title), rebooting the Godzilla story. It was followed by two sequel series, Godzilla (published in book form as Godzilla: History's Greatest Monster) and Godzilla: Rulers of Earth (published in book form as Godzilla: Complete Rulers of Earth Volume 1 and Godzilla: Complete Rulers of Earth Volume 2), as well as seven five-issue miniseries to date.

To tie-in with the 2014 film, three books were published. Titan Books published a novelization of the movie in May 2014, written by Greg Cox. The graphic novel Godzilla: Awakening by Max Borenstein, Greg Borenstein and Eric Battle served as a prequel, and Godzilla: The Art of Destruction by Mark Cotta told about the making of the movie. Godzilla has been referenced in The Simpsons comics on three separate occasions. The character is featured in Bart Simpson's Guide to Life where it and other kaiju characters such as Minilla and King Ghidorah can be seen; it is featured in the comic "An Anime Among Us!" and K-Bart.  Godzilla is also featured in the comic Bart Simpson's Treehouse of Horror 7 where it and other kaiju can be seen referenced on the front cover.

Music
Godzilla: The Album, the soundtrack album of Godzilla (1998), sold 2.5million copies worldwide. The album's lead single, "Come with Me" by Puff Daddy featuring Jimmy Page, sold a certified 2.025million copies worldwide. Its Japan-exclusive single, "Lose Control" by Japanese rock band L'Arc-en-Ciel, sold 938,401 copies in Japan. Shin Godzilla Ongakushuu, the soundtrack album of Shin Godzilla (2016), sold 43,951 copies in Japan. Mars (1991), an album by the Japanese rock duo B'z featuring a Godzilla-themed song, sold 1,730,500 copies in Japan.

Blue Öyster Cult released the song "Godzilla" in 1977. It was the first track, and the second of four singles, from their fifth studio album Spectres (also 1977). Artists such as Fu Manchu, Racer X and Double Experience have included cover versions of this song on their albums. American musician Michale Graves wrote a song titled "Godzilla" for his 2005 album Punk Rock Is Dead. The lyrics mention Godzilla and several on-screen adversaries such as Mothra, Hedorah, Destoroyah and Gigan. The Brazilian heavy metal band Sepultura has a song titled "Biotech is Godzilla" on its 1993 release Chaos A.D.

Composer Eric Whitacre wrote a piece for wind ensemble titled "Godzilla Eats Las Vegas!" The work was commissioned by Thomas Leslie of the University of Nevada, Las Vegas and was premiered in 1996 by the university's wind band. Annotations on the score instruct performers to dress in costume and a "script" is provided for the audience. Since the piece's premiere, it has been performed by notable ensembles including the United States Marine Band and the Scottish National Wind Symphony.

The French death metal band Gojira named the band after Godzilla's name in Japanese. The song "Simon Says" by Pharoahe Monch is a hip-hop remix of the "Godzilla March" theme song. The instrumental version of this song was notably used in the 2000 film Charlie's Angels. The British band Lostprophets released a song called "We Are Godzilla, You Are Japan" on its second studio album Start Something. The American punk band Groovie Ghoulies released a song called "Hats off to You (Godzilla)" as a tribute to Godzilla. It is featured on the EP Freaks on Parade released in 2002.

The American artist Doctor Steel released a song called 'Atomic Superstar' about Godzilla on his album People of Earth in 2002. In 2003, the British singer Siouxsie Sioux released the album Hái! with her band The Creatures; the album had a Japanese theme with a song dedicated to the monster, simply titled "Godzilla!". The record label Shifty issued the compilation album Destroysall with 15 songs from 15 bands, ranging from hardcore punk to doom-laden death metal. Not all of the songs are dedicated to Godzilla, but all do appear connected to monsters from Toho Studios. Fittingly, the disc was released on August 1, 2003, the 35th anniversary of the Japanese release of Destroy All Monsters.

King Geedorah (a.k.a. MF DOOM) released Take Me to Your Leader, a hip-hop album featuring guests from the group Monsta Island Czars, another Godzilla-themed hip-hop group. These albums include multiple Godzilla samples throughout the series. Taiwanese American electronic musician Mochipet released the EP Godzilla Rehab Center on August 21, 2012, featuring songs named after monsters in the series including Gigan, King Ghidorah, Moguera and Hedorah.

In 2019, American rock band Think Sanity released their debut album featuring songs based on Godzilla, Mothra, and Hedorah. The songs are titled "Sad Kaiju", "Mothra", and "Sludge", respectively. The monsters are also mentioned by name on the track "News at Six" in which they are comically described by newscaster Chip Bentley as destroying a nearby town. The band has mentioned in interviews that they have also written songs based on Biollante, King Ghidorah, and Rodan as well.

Geographic features
The largest megamullion, located 600 kilometres to the south-east of Okinotorishima, the southernmost Japanese island, is named the Godzilla Megamullion. The Japan Coast Guard played a role in name, reaching an agreement with Toho who owns the rights to Godzilla. Toho's Chief Godzilla officer Keiji Ota stated that "I am truly honored that (the megamullion) bears Godzilla's name, the Earth's most powerful monster."

Cultural impact

Godzilla is one of the most recognizable symbols of Japanese popular culture worldwide and is an important facet of Japanese films, embodying the kaiju subset of the tokusatsu genre. It has been considered an allegory of nuclear weapons. The earlier Godzilla films, especially the original Godzilla, portrayed Godzilla as a frightening, nuclear monster. Godzilla represented the fears that many Japanese held about the nuclear attacks on Hiroshima and Nagasaki and the possibility of recurrence.

As the series progressed, so did Godzilla, changing into a less destructive and more heroic character. Ghidorah (1964) was the turning point in Godzilla's transformation from villain to hero, by pitting him against a greater threat to humanity, King Ghidorah. Godzilla has since been viewed as an anti-hero. Roger Ebert cites Godzilla as a notable example of a villain-turned-hero, along with King Kong, the James Bond films' Jaws, the Terminator, and Rambo.

In the United States, Godzilla films from Toho had been airing on television every week since 1960 up until the 1990s.

Godzilla is considered "the original radioactive superhero" due to his accidental radioactive origin story predating Spider-Man (1962 debut), though Godzilla did not become a hero until Ghidorah in 1964. By the 1970s, Godzilla came to be viewed as a superhero, with the magazine King of the Monsters in 1977 describing Godzilla as "Superhero of the '70s." In 1973, Godzilla was voted the most popular movie monster in The Monster Times poll, beating Count Dracula, King Kong, Wolf Man, The Mummy, Creature From the Black Lagoon, and Frankenstein's monster. In 1977, a survey in Los Angeles found that 80% of boys aged between four and nine years old were Godzilla fans.

In 2010, the Sea Shepherd Conservation Society named their most recently acquired scout vessel MV Gojira. Toho, the people in charge of the Godzilla franchise, served them with a notice to remove the name and in response the boat's name was changed in May 2011 to MV Brigitte Bardot.

Steven Spielberg cited Godzilla as an inspiration for Jurassic Park (1993), specifically Godzilla, King of the Monsters! (1956), which he grew up watching. During its production, Spielberg described Godzilla as "the most masterful of all the dinosaur movies because it made you believe it was really happening." Godzilla also influenced the Spielberg film Jaws (1975). Godzilla has also been cited as an inspiration by actor Tim Allen and filmmakers Martin Scorsese and Tim Burton.

Merchandise
Godzilla toy sales in Japan earned Toho annual royalties of  during the late 1970s. Godzilla licensed merchandise generated  in annual sales during the late 1970s, adding up to approximately  merchandise sales between 1975 and 1979.

In 1985, Godzilla merchandise sold  in Japan, with Doug Mason of Chicago Tribune referring to Godzilla as "Japan's Mickey Mouse." Godzilla vs. Mechagodzilla II generated  from sales of books and merchandise between 1993 and 1994.

American toy companies such as Mattel and Trendmasters were selling  Godzilla toys annually in the United States during the mid-1990s, with Trendmasters alone selling more than  Godzilla toys between 1994 and 1995. United Productions of America (UPA), the American distributor for Toho's Godzilla films in the 1990s, sold  Godzilla toys within nine months between 1994 and 1995.

Awards

 1954 Japan Movie Association Awards – Special Effects (Godzilla (1954))
 1965 Japan Academy Award – Best Score (Mothra vs. Godzilla)
 1966 Japan Academy Award – Special Effects (Invasion of Astro-Monster)
 1986 Japan Academy Award – Special Effects and Newcomer of the Year (The Return of Godzilla)
 1986 Razzie Awards – Worst Supporting Actor and Worst New Star (The Return of Godzilla)
 1992 Japan Academy Award – Special Effects (Godzilla vs. King Ghidorah)
 1993 Tokyo Sports Movie Awards – Best Leading Actor (Godzilla vs. Mothra)
 1993 Best Grossing Films Award – Golden Award and Money-Making Star Award (Godzilla vs. Mothra)
 1993 Japan Academy Award – Best Score (Godzilla vs. Mothra)
 1994 Japan Academy Award – Best Score (Godzilla vs. Mechagodzilla II)
 1995 Best Grossing Films Award – Silver Award (Godzilla vs. SpaceGodzilla)
 1996 Best Grossing Films Award – Golden Award (Godzilla vs. Destoroyah)
 1996 Japan Academy Award – Special Effects (Godzilla vs. Destoroyah)
 1996 MTV Movie Awards – Lifetime Achievement*
 1998 Golden Raspberry Awards – Worst Supporting Actress and Worst Remake or Sequel (Godzilla (1998))
 1999 Saturn Awards – Best Special Effects (Godzilla (1998))
 2001 Saturn Awards – Best Home Video Release (Godzilla 2000)
 2002 Best Grossing Films Award – Silver Award (Godzilla, Mothra and King Ghidorah: Giant Monsters All-Out Attack)
 2004 Hollywood Walk of Fame – (Godzilla: Final Wars)
 2007 Saturn Awards – Best DVD Classic Film Release (Godzilla (1954))
 2014 22nd Annual Japan Cool Content Contribution Award (Godzilla (2014))
 2017 40th Japan Academy Prize – Best Picture, Best Director, Cinematography, Lighting Direction, Art Direction, Sound Recording, Film Editing (Shin Godzilla)

(*) In 1996 Godzilla received an award for Lifetime Achievement at the MTV Movie Awards. Creator and producer Shōgo Tomiyama accepted on his behalf via satellite and was joined by "Godzilla" himself.

Name usage

"-zilla" is a well-known slang suffix, used to imply some form of excess to a person, object or theme; some examples being the reality TV show Bridezillas and the Netscape-derived web browser Mozilla Firefox.

Notes

References

Citations

Sources

External links
 Official Godzilla website by Toho Co., Ltd. 
 Official website of Toho Co., Ltd. 

 
Apocalyptic films
Films about nuclear war and weapons
Mass media franchises introduced in 1954
Films adapted into comics
Films adapted into television shows
Bandai brands
Kaiju films
Monster movies
Giant monster films
Films about dinosaurs
Science fiction film franchises
Fantasy film franchises
Horror film franchises
Action film franchises
Japanese fantasy films
Japanese epic films
Japanese science fiction films
Japanese science fiction action films
Japanese science fiction adventure films
Japanese adventure films
Japanese political films
Japanese disaster films